Rocío Andrea Soto Collao (born 21 September 1993) is a Chilean footballer who plays as a defender for Santiago Morning and the Chile women's national team.

International career
Soto represented Chile at the 2010 FIFA U-17 Women's World Cup.

References

External links 
 

1993 births
Living people
Chilean women's footballers
Women's association football defenders
Colo-Colo (women) footballers
Zaragoza CFF players
Santiago Morning (women) footballers
Chile women's international footballers
Footballers at the 2011 Pan American Games
Pan American Games competitors for Chile
Competitors at the 2014 South American Games
South American Games silver medalists for Chile
South American Games medalists in football
Chilean expatriate women's footballers
Chilean expatriate sportspeople in Spain
Expatriate women's footballers in Spain
2019 FIFA Women's World Cup players
People from Maipo Province